Carl Mayer (1894-1944) was a German screenplay writer.

Carl Mayer may also refer to:
Carl J. Mayer (born 1959), American lawyer, politician, author, public speaker and consumer advocate
Carl Mayer von Rothschild (1788-1855), 19th-century German banker

See also
Karl Mayer, a character on Desperate Housewives
Carl Meyer (disambiguation)
Karl Meyer (disambiguation)